The gal (symbol: Gal), sometimes called galileo after Galileo Galilei, is a unit of acceleration typically used in precision gravimetry. The gal is defined as 1 centimeter per second squared (1 cm/s2). The milligal (mGal) and microgal (µGal) are respectively one thousandth and one millionth of a gal.

The gal is not part of the International System of Units (known by its French-language initials "SI"). In 1978 the CIPM decided that it was permissible to use the gal "with the SI until the CIPM considers that [its] use is no longer necessary". Use of the gal was deprecated by the standard ISO 80000-3:2006, now superseded.

The gal is a derived unit, defined in terms of the centimeter–gram–second (CGS) base unit of length, the centimeter, and the second, which is the base unit of time in both the CGS and the modern SI system. In SI base units, 1 Gal is equal to 0.01 m/s2.

The acceleration due to Earth's gravity (see Standard gravity) at its surface is 976 to 983 Gal, the variation being due mainly to differences in latitude and elevation. Mountains and masses of lesser density within the Earth's crust typically cause variations in gravitational acceleration of tens to hundreds of milligals (mGal). The gravity gradient (variation with height) above Earth's surface is about 3.1 µGal per centimeter of height, resulting in a maximal difference of about 2 Gal (0.02 m/s2) from the top of Mount Everest to sea level.

Unless it is being used at the beginning of a sentence or in paragraph or section titles, the unit name gal is properly spelled with a lowercase g. As with the torr and its symbol, the unit name (gal) and its symbol (Gal) are spelled identically except that the latter is capitalized.

Conversions

See also
 Earth's gravity
 Eotvos (unit)
 g-force (g) 
 Gravimeter
 Gravitation
 Gravitational constant (G)
 Gravitational field
 Gravity gradiometry

References

Units of acceleration
Centimetre–gram–second system of units
Gravimetry